Ender may refer to:

Given name
 Ender Alkan, Turkish footballer
 Ender Arslan, Turkish basketball player
 Ender Inciarte, Venezuelan baseball player
 Ender Konca, Turkish footballer

Surname
 Erika Ender (born 1974), Panamanian singer, songwriter and actress
 Erwin Josef Ender (1937-2022), German prelate of Roman Catholic Church
 Kornelia Ender (born 1958), East German swimmer, multiple Olympic champion
 Wolfgang Ender (born 1946), Olympic Alpine skier from Liechtenstein

In fiction
 Ender Wiggin, character from Orson Scott Card's Ender's Game science fiction series
The prefix ender-, a prefix in the videogame Minecraft (made by Mojang Studios),which denotes mobs  (characters) that are found in the End (a dimension in the game) by appearing at the start of the word for the mob,like for example endermite or enderman
 The Ender Empire, a nation from the Total Conquest Expanded Universe

Other uses
"Ender", a song by A from How Ace Are Buildings

See also

 
 End (disambiguation)
 Enders (disambiguation)
 Endor (disambiguation)
 Enda, an Irish given name
 

Turkish masculine given names